The Deputy Mayor of London for Business is a position appointed by the Mayor of London. The inaugural holder of the Deputy Mayor of London for Business and Enterprise office, Kit Malthouse, was appointed by Mayor Boris Johnson. He was succeeded by Rajesh Agrawal, the current officeholder and the position renamed to Deputy Mayor of London for Business.

List of Deputy Mayors for Business

References

Local government in London